Dark Noontide is the fourth album from experimental indie rock band Six Organs of Admittance, released in 2002.

Track listing
"Spirits Abandoned"  6.21
"Regeneration"  5.32
"On Returning Home"  5.46
"Dark Noontide"  6.55
"This Hand"  4.45
"Awaken" 1.43
"Khidr and the Fountain"  7.27
"A Thousand Birds"  3.24

References

2002 albums
Six Organs of Admittance albums